The 111th New York Infantry Regiment was organized at Auburn, New York, to answer the call by Abraham Lincoln for 300,000 more troops to fight in the American Civil War.  Over the next three years, this regiment lost the fifth greatest number of men among all New York regiments.

History
Jesse Segoine was authorized on July 18, 1862, to begin recruiting a regiment of men within the Cayuga and Wayne Counties, New York.  As Segoine was able to raise the men, he received a commission of Colonel and commander of this, the 111th New York Infantry Regiment.  The regiment was raised in almost a month's time, and mustered into service in Auburn, New York, on August 20, 1862.

Regimental organization
Company A – Principally recruited from Wayne County.

Company B – Principally recruited from Wayne County.

Company C – Principally recruited from Wayne County.

Company D – Principally recruited from Wayne County.

Company E – Principally recruited from Wayne County.

Company F – Principally recruited from Cayuga County

Company G – Principally recruited from Cayuga County.

Company H – Principally recruited from Cayuga County.

Company I – Principally recruited from Cayuga County.

Company K – Principally recruited from Cayuga County.

Army organization

Time line

Gettysburg Campaign – June 25 – July 24, 1863

Two companies were left on guard at Accotink bridge, the remaining eight, numbering 390 men, joined the Second Corps on the march to Gettysburg.

Bristoe Campaign – October 9–22, 1863

Mine Run Campaign – November 26 – December 2, 1863

Campaign from the Rapidan to the James –  May 3 – June 15, 1864

Appomattox Campaign – March 28 – April 9. 1865

The regiment lost 81 casualties in the last campaign of the war

Regiment losses
Over the 111th Regiment's time in service, total enrollment was 1,780 soldiers.  Ten officers and 210 men were killed and mortally wounded in battle.  The total of 220 men who were killed and died of wounds is only exceeded by four other New York regiments — the 69th, 40th, 48th and 121st.  In the entire Union Army, that number is only exceeded by 24 other regiments.  Disease and other causes took another 2 officers and 177 enlisted men.  This raises the total sacrificed to reunite this nation to 404. Two officers and 74 men died while in the confinement of Confederate prisons.

Post war

See also

List of New York Civil War regiments
New York in the American Civil War

References

Further reading
 Annual Report of the Adjutant General of the State of New York For the Year 1893, Volume 34
 Campbell, Eric A. ' "Remember Harper's Ferry!" : The degradation, humiliation, and redemption of Col. George L Willard's Brigade – Part Two.' Gettysburg: Historical Articles of Lasting Interest. 8 (January 1993) 95–110.
 Contant, George W. Each bee was a bullet. Dover, Del. : Grand Army Historic Publications, 1998. 60 p. : ill. ; 21 cm.
 Drummond, Robert Loudon. The religious pray, the profane swear: a Civil War memoir personal reminiscences of prison life during the war of the rebellion. Aurora, CO : Davies Group, 2002. x, 108 p. : ill. ; 22 cm.
 Hall, Henry. "History of Auburn" Auburn, NY: Dennis Brothers & Co., 1869. pp. 429–435.
 Husk, Martin W. "The 111th New York Volunteer Infantry: a Civil War history." Jefferson, N.C. : McFarland & Co., 2010.
 Loperfido, Christopher E. "Death, Disease, and Life at War: The Civil War Letters of Surgeon James D. Benton, 111th and 98th New York Infantry Regiments." Savas Beatie. 2018.
 Monroe, Joel H. "Gen. Clinton D. MacDougall." Historical Records of a Hundred and Twenty Years. Geneva, NY: W.F. Humphrey, 1913.
 Murray, R.L. and David Hickey (ed.). The redemption of the "Harper's Ferry Cowards" : the story of the 111th and 126th New York state volunteer regiments at Gettysburg. 1994. [E 523.5 126th .M]

External links
  Civil War in the East:  111th New York Infantry Regiment
  Civil War Index:  111th New York Infantry Regiment
   Family Search:  111th Regiment, New York Infantry
  New York State Military Museum:  111th Infantry Regiment
  [https://www.savasbeatie.com/death-disease-and-life-at-war-the-civil-war-letters-of-surgeon-james-d-benton-111th-and-98th-new-york-infantry-regiments-1862-1865/Infantry 111
1862 establishments in New York (state)
Military units and formations established in 1862
Military units and formations disestablished in 1865